Bruce Simpson may refer to:

Bruce Simpson (athlete) (born 1950), Canadian Olympic pole vaulter
Bruce Simpson (blogger), New Zealand blogger